Solenn Marie Adea Heussaff-Bolzico (née Heussaff, ;  born July 20, 1985) is a Filipino actress, model and singer. She was one of the official castaways of Survivor Philippines: Celebrity Showdown. She made it to the Final Three. 
In December 2010, she signed a recording contract with MCA Music, a movie contract with Regal Entertainment, and a television contract with GMA Network and GMA Artist Center.

Early life
Solenn Heussaff is the second child of Cynthia Adea, a Filipina, and Louis Paul Heussaff, a former sailor in the French Navy from Douarnenez, in Brittany, who is now the head of a service company SOS, for the petroleum industry. She has an older sister named Vanessa and a younger brother named Erwan.

Education
After graduating from Eurocampus (now European International School), Heussaff went on to study fashion design in Studio Berçot, Paris for three years. She also took a 6-month course in basic beauty/fashion make-up, body painting and prosthetics at L'école Fleurimont, Paris. She then proceeded further studies at the Make Up Forever Academy.

Career

Early career
Before she entered showbiz, she was an endorser of several products in and outside the country. She endorsed top brands such as Pop Cola, Kotex, Vitress Hair Solutions, Asian Secrets, Colgate, Argentina Corned Beef, Century Tuna, Greenwich Pizza and Pasta, Robinsons Land Corporation, Kenny Rogers Roasters, Axe, Holiday Ham and Milo NutriUp.

Survivor Philippines: Celebrity Showdown
Solenn Heusaff became one of the fan favorites in the reality show Survivor Philippines: Celebrity Showdown. She was also one of the most controversial castaways and even became one of the trending topics on Facebook and other social networking sites during the airing of the show. She ended up being one of the top three finalists alongside Ervic Vijandre and Akihiro Sato. The latter was declared winner.

Acting career
After Survivor Philippines, GMA Network already had several projects lined up for her. She became one of Richard Gutierrez's leading ladies in the film My Valentine Girls alongside Lovi Poe. In the film, she played the role of Richard's best friend who later became his girlfriend.

She was also chosen as one of the leading ladies of Richard Gutierrez in the telefantasya Captain Barbell, which aired in March 2011. She currently has a makeover show on GMA News TV which also started airing in March 2011. Her role was that of a reporter named "Janna". She had a limited airing time in the show because of other projects such as Temptation Island in which she starred alongside Marian Rivera, Heart Evangelista, Lovi Poe and Rufa Mae Quinto.

In 2014, Heussaff played the female lead character in the indie film "Mumbai Love" opposite Kiko Matos.

Music career
Heussaff released her self-titled debut album on July 17, 2011, on Party Pilipinas. She then had her first autograph signing at SM Mall and Astroplus The Block on the same day. She held her first major concert from August 19 to 26, 2011 at Teatrino Promenade, Greenhills.

She released her second album entitled SOS on August 23, 2013. On August 25 after Heussaff performed her latest single, "Diva" featuring Ron Henley from her second album, she was awarded her first platinum award for her self-titled album.

In 2016, Heussaff released her third album, Solenn, on September 2 after a year of production. The album was inspired about love and she co-wrote most of the songs.

Personal life
In 2012, Heussaff began dating Nico Bolzico, an Argentine businessman. In December 2014, Heussaff announced her engagement to Bolzico. The couple married on May 21, 2016, in Combourg, France. In August 2019, she announced her pregnancy via Instagram. Heussaff gave birth to a daughter named Thylane Katana Bolzico at the St. Luke's Medical Center in Taguig on January 1, 2020.

She is also the sister of Erwan Heussaff, the husband of actress Anne Curtis.

Solenn announced on July 4, 2022 that she and her husband are expecting a second child. On 14 December 2022, she gave birth to their second daughter named Maëlys Lionel Bolzico.

Filmography

Television

Film

Commercials

Accolades

References

External links

1985 births
Living people
Filipino female models
Survivor Philippines contestants
Filipino film actresses
Filipino people of French descent
Filipino Roman Catholics
Filipino television actresses
People from Makati
Actresses from Metro Manila
21st-century Filipino actresses
VJs (media personalities)
GMA Network personalities
Filipina gravure idols
MCA Music Inc. (Philippines) artists
GMA Music artists
21st-century Filipino singers
21st-century Filipino women singers